Adams Farm is a historic home and farm complex located near Princess Anne, Somerset County, Maryland, United States. It consists of a -story, 19th-century frame house with Greek Revival trim that was enlarged and reconfigured with Late Victorian alterations in the third quarter of the century and Colonial Revival changes about 1900. Also on the property are numerous domestic and agricultural outbuildings most of which date from the late 19th century.

The Adams Farm was listed on the National Register of Historic Places in 1988.

References

External links
, including photo from 1986, at Maryland Historical Trust

Houses in Somerset County, Maryland
Houses on the National Register of Historic Places in Maryland
Greek Revival houses in Maryland
Victorian architecture in Maryland
Colonial Revival architecture in Maryland
National Register of Historic Places in Somerset County, Maryland